Edentaggart is a settlement of a few houses in Argyll and Bute, Scotland. It is located near the town of Alexandria.

The area is made up of Sheep farms and rolling hills.

Notable People 
Hannah Rankin, Professional Boxer

References

Geography of Argyll and Bute